was a Japanese samurai of the Sengoku period, who served as general of ashigaru (demanding post) the Takeda clan. He lived well into the early Edo period.

References

Samurai
1545 births
1624 deaths
Takeda retainers